John Regis may refer to:

 Johannes Regis (c.1425–c.1496), Franco-Flemish composer of the Renaissance 
 John Francis Regis S.J. (1597–1640), French preacher recognized as a saint by the Roman Catholic Church
 John Regis (athlete) (born 1966), retired English athlete